Dorang class is a patrol boat class of the Indonesian Navy, also known as Type PC-60 or PC-60M patrol boat. It was developed from KCR-60M and PC-40 designed and built locally across various Indonesian shipyards.

As of December 2022, two vessels of the Dorang class already in active service with four other under construction. When Indonesia is in a state of emergency, the Dorang-class patrol boats can be modified to be equipped with anti-ship missiles.

Background
During the appointment ceremony of Indonesian Navy's then Eastern Fleet Command chief of staff, Rear Admiral Darwanto on 23 January 2015, Indonesia's then Chief of Staff of the Navy, Admiral Ade Supandi stated that to prevent illegal fishing by foreign commercial vessels in eastern Indonesia, the Indonesian Navy needs at least 15-20 patrol boats operating every day. But for the initial stage, he projects to acquire at least 22 patrol boats first through a gradual procurement process, and also aims to replace older patrol boats.

On 31 August 2022, the first two PC-60 patrol boats were inaugurated by Admiral Yudo Margono with Dorang (874) being the lead ship for the class.

Characteristics

Armaments
The Dorang-class patrol boat has standard armament in the form of a single-barreled 40 mm OTO Melara main gun which has a tracking system capability because it is equipped with a Laser Range Finder, IR Camera, Day Camera and is integrated with the Fire Control System. In addition, two 12.7 mm heavy machine guns were also installed on the right and left sides of the hull as a defense weapon against air attacks. This ship can be fitted with anti-ship missiles at the stern if required in further modification.

Design
She has a displacement of 520 tons, with a maximum sailing endurance of six days and can carry 46 active plus 9 reserve personnel.

Ship in class

References

2022 ships
Patrol vessels of the Indonesian Navy
Patrol boat classes